Cariari National Wetlands is a nature reserve, part of both the Tortuguero and Caribbean La Amistad Conservation Areas, in the Limón Province of northeastern Costa Rica. It protects mangrove swamps and marine areas on the Caribbean coast. It covers all of the coast from the Tortuguero National Park to the Pacuare Matina Forest Reserve.

References

External links 
 Cariari National Wetlands at Costa Rica National Parks

Nature reserves in Costa Rica
Geography of Limón Province